The Oil Creek and Allegheny River Railway was a railroad in western Pennsylvania. 

Initially incorporated under a special act of Pennsylvania on 17 April 1861 as the Warren and Tidioute Railway, it changed its name first to the Warren and Franklin Railway on 31 March 1864, and finally to the Oil Creek and Allegheny River Railway on 26 February 1868, when it was consolidated with the Oil Creek Railroad, the Farmers Railroad, and the Oil City and Pithole Railroad.

In 1869, John Pitcairn was appointed its General Manager. 

The company was sold at foreclosure on 29 December 1875, and was acquired 8 February 1876 by the Pittsburgh, Titusville and Buffalo Railway, which eventually became part of the Western New York and Pennsylvania Railway and the Pennsylvania Railroad.

In the period just prior to foreclosure, from 1874–75, the company's president was John Scott and its treasurer was H. A. Phillips.

See also
 Oil Creek Railroad

References

External links
History of the Oil Creek Railroad Company

Predecessors of the Pennsylvania Railroad
Defunct Pennsylvania railroads
Railway companies established in 1868
Railway companies disestablished in 1875
American companies established in 1868
American companies disestablished in 1875
1868 establishments in Pennsylvania
1875 disestablishments in Pennsylvania